Aremu is a given name. Notable people with the name include:

Aremu Afeez (born 1999), Nigerian footballer 
Aremu Afolayan (born 1980), Nigerian film actor

See also
Aremu, surname